Magdaleno Martínez was a Cuban third baseman in the Negro leagues and Cuban League between 1918 and 1921.

A native of Regla, Cuba, Martínez played in the Negro leagues for the All Cubans in 1921, and had previously played for the Almendares club in the Cuban League.

References

External links
 and Seamheads

1890 births
Date of birth missing
Year of death missing
Place of birth missing
Place of death missing
All Cubans players
Almendares (baseball) players
Baseball third basemen
Baseball players from Havana
Cuban expatriate baseball players in the United States